Asad Siddiqui is a Pakistani actor, who started his acting career while studying for his MBA. The nephew of actor Adnan Siddiqui, he appeared in notable television projects including Gumrah, Khuda Dekh Raha Hai, Shikwa, Dareecha, Azar Ki Ayegi Baraat, Joru Ka Ghulam, Sanam, Tawaan. He is best known for his role as an Antagonist in Surkh Chandni which is about Acid Attack victims. He made his film debut with Wajahat Rauf's Chhalawa with his real life partner Zara Noor Abbas.

Personal life
Siddiqui is the nephew of actor Adnan Siddiqui.

In 2017, he married fellow actress Zara Noor Abbas, daughter of actress Asma Abbas and niece of actress Bushra Ansari. According to Abbas, they first meet on sets of Kis Ki Ayegi Baraat. The marriage ceremony was held in Karachi, Pakistan.

Filmography

Television

Film

Music video

References

External links

1987 births
Living people
Pakistani male television actors
Male actors from Karachi